Amor de barrio (English title: Love from the Hood), is a Mexican telenovela produced by Roberto Hernández for Televisa. It is a remake of the 1979 Mexican telenovela, Muchacha de barrio and Paloma'' produced in 1975.

Series overview

Episodes

June 2015

July 2015

August 2015

September 2015

October 2015

November 2015

References 

Lists of Mexican drama television series episodes